Alexander Cummings Downey (February 6, 1889 – July 10, 1949) was an outfielder in Major League Baseball who played for the Brooklyn Superbas in its 1909 season. He attended Georgetown University.

External links

1889 births
1949 deaths
Major League Baseball outfielders
Baseball players from Indiana
Brooklyn Superbas players
Minor league baseball managers
Oklahoma City Mets players
Webb City Webfeet players
Oklahoma City Indians players
Austin Senators players
Beaumont Oilers players
Georgetown University alumni